Anthony Smith (born 15 August 1961) is a former English cricketer. Smith was a right-handed batsman who bowled slow left-arm orthodox. He was born in Burnley, Lancashire.

Smith made his debut for Wales Minor Counties in the 1989 Minor Counties Championship against Cornwall. He played Minor counties cricket for Wales Minor Counties from 1989 to 2004, which included 35 Minor Counties Championship matches and 8 MCCA Knockout Trophy matches. He made his List A debut in the 1993 Benson & Hedges Cup for a combined Minor Counties cricket team against Durham. He played a further match for the team in the following season's competition against Sussex. It was in the 1993 season that he made his List A debut for Wales Minor Counties against Nottinghamshire in the NatWest Trophy. He played 3 further List A matches for the team, the last coming against Middlesex in the 2004 Cheltenham & Gloucester Trophy. In his 6 List A matches, he took 9 wickets at a bowling average of 20.77, with best figures of 3/40.

References

External links

1961 births
Living people
Cricketers from Burnley
English cricketers
Wales National County cricketers
Minor Counties cricketers